Balaka longirostris is a species of flowering plant in the family Arecaceae. It is found only in Fiji.

References

longirostris
Endemic flora of Fiji
Least concern plants
Taxa named by Odoardo Beccari
Taxonomy articles created by Polbot